Eta Aquarii, Latinized from η Aquarii, is the Bayer designation for a star in the equatorial constellation of Aquarius. It is visible to the naked eye with an apparent visual magnitude of 4.04. It is drifting closer to the Sun with a radial velocity of –8 km/s. Eta Aquarii is near the radiant of a meteor shower named after it.

The stellar classification of Eta Aquarii is B9IV-Vn, which may indicate that it is beginning to evolve away from the main sequence into a subgiant as the supply of hydrogen at its core becomes exhausted. It is 65 million years old and is spinning rapidly with a high projected rotational velocity of 271 km/s. This rotation is causing an equatorial bulge, giving the star an oblate figure with a 24% larger radius at the equator than at the poles. The Doppler effect from the rapid rotation is causing the absorption lines in the star's spectrum to blur, as indicated by the 'n' suffix in the star's classification. Eta Aquarii has an estimated 2.96 times the mass of the Sun and 2.8 times the Sun's radius. The star is radiating 103 times the luminosity of the Sun from its photosphere at an effective temperature of 11,042 K.

Naming
This star, along with γ Aqr (Sadachbia), π Aqr (Seat) and ζ Aqr (Sadaltager / Achr al Achbiya), were al Aḣbiyah (الأخبية), the Tent.

References

External links
 Image Eta Aquarii

B-type main-sequence stars
B-type subgiants

Aquarius (constellation)
Aquarii, Eta
BD-00 4384
Aquarii, 062
213998
111497
8597